Aspidoscelis pictus, the Isla Monserrate whiptail, is a species of teiid lizard endemic to Isla Monserrate in Mexico.

References

pictus
Reptiles described in 1921
Taxa named by John Van Denburgh
Taxa named by Joseph Richard Slevin
Reptiles of Mexico